Atabay may refer to:

People
Kambiz Atabay (born 1939), Iranian sports administrator

Places
Atabəy, Azerbaijan
Atabay, a barangay in Salcedo, Ilocos Sur, Philippines
Atabay, a barangay in Ayungon, Negros Oriental, Philippines
Atabay, a barangay in San Jose, Antique, Philippines
Atabay, a barangay in San Remigio, Antique, Philippines
Atabay, a barangay in Alcoy, Cebu, Philippines
Atabay, a barangay in Hilongos, Leyte, Philippines
Atabay, a barangay in Alimodian, Iloilo, Philippines
Atabay, a barangay in Tobias Fornier, Antique, Philippines